Carpatolechia longivalvella is a moth of the family Gelechiidae. It is found in South Korea.

The wingspan is 13.5–15 mm. The species can be distinguished by the rather elongate central yellowish patch on the forewings and the well-developed grey scales under this patch.

References

Moths described in 1992
Carpatolechia
Moths of Korea